Kate Hore (born 25 March 1995) is an Australian rules footballer playing for the Melbourne Football Club in the AFL Women's (AFLW). Hore was recruited by Melbourne as a  rookie signing in May 2017. She made her debut in the six point win against  at Casey Fields in the opening round of the 2018 season. The 2020 AFL Women's season saw Hore obtain her first AFL Women's All-Australian team selection, named in the full forward position.

References

External links 

1995 births
Living people
Melbourne Football Club (AFLW) players
Australian rules footballers from Victoria (Australia)
Victorian Women's Football League players